In computer science, a simple precedence parser is a type of bottom-up parser for context-free grammars that can be used only by simple precedence grammars.

The implementation of the parser is quite similar to the generic bottom-up parser. A stack is used to store a viable prefix of a sentential form from a rightmost derivation. The symbols ⋖, ≐ and ⋗ are used to identify the pivot, and to know when to Shift or when to Reduce.

Implementation
 Compute the Wirth–Weber precedence relationship table for a grammar with initial symbol S.
 Initialize a stack with the starting marker $.
 Append an ending marker $ to the string being parsed (Input).
 Until Stack equals "$ S" and Input equals "$"
 Search the table for the relationship between Top(stack) and NextToken(Input)
 if the relationship is ⋖ or ≐
 Shift:
 Push(Stack, relationship)
 Push(Stack, NextToken(Input))
 RemoveNextToken(Input)
 if the relationship is ⋗
 Reduce:
 SearchProductionToReduce(Stack)
 Remove the Pivot from the Stack
 Search the table for the relationship between the nonterminal from the production and first symbol in the stack (Starting from top)
 Push(Stack, relationship)
 Push(Stack, Non terminal)

SearchProductionToReduce (Stack)
 Find the topmost ⋖ in the stack; this and all the symbols above it are the Pivot.
 Find the production of the grammar which has the Pivot as its right side.

Example

Given following language, which can parse arithmetic expressions with the multiplication and addition operations:
E  --> E + T' | T'
T' --> T
T  --> T * F  | F
F  --> ( E' ) | num
E' --> E

num is a terminal, and the lexer parse any integer as num; E represents an arithmetic expression, T is a term and F is a factor.

and the Parsing table:

STACK                   PRECEDENCE    INPUT            ACTION

$                            ⋖        2 * ( 1 + 3 )$   SHIFT
$ ⋖ 2                        ⋗        * ( 1 + 3 )$     REDUCE (F -> num)
$ ⋖ F                        ⋗        * ( 1 + 3 )$     REDUCE (T -> F)
$ ⋖ T                        ≐        * ( 1 + 3 )$     SHIFT
$ ⋖ T ≐ *                    ⋖        ( 1 + 3 )$       SHIFT
$ ⋖ T ≐ * ⋖ (                ⋖        1 + 3 )$         SHIFT
$ ⋖ T ≐ * ⋖ ( ⋖ 1            ⋗        + 3 )$           REDUCE 4× (F -> num) (T -> F) (T' -> T) (E ->T ') 
$ ⋖ T ≐ * ⋖ ( ⋖ E            ≐        + 3 )$           SHIFT
$ ⋖ T ≐ * ⋖ ( ⋖ E ≐ +        ⋖        3 )$             SHIFT
$ ⋖ T ≐ * ⋖ ( ⋖ E ≐ + < 3    ⋗        )$               REDUCE 3× (F -> num) (T -> F) (T' -> T) 
$ ⋖ T ≐ * ⋖ ( ⋖ E ≐ + ≐ T    ⋗        )$               REDUCE 2× (E -> E + T) (E' -> E)
$ ⋖ T ≐ * ⋖ ( ≐ E'           ≐        )$               SHIFT
$ ⋖ T ≐ * ⋖ ( ≐ E' ≐ )       ⋗        $                REDUCE (F -> ( E' ))
$ ⋖ T ≐ * ≐ F                ⋗        $                REDUCE (T -> T * F)
$ ⋖ T                        ⋗        $                REDUCE 2× (T' -> T) (E -> T')
$ ⋖ E                                 $                ACCEPT

References
 Alfred V. Aho, Jeffrey D. Ullman (1977). Principles of Compiler Design. 1st Edition. Addison–Wesley.
 William A. Barrett, John D. Couch (1979). Compiler construction: Theory and Practice. Science Research Associate.
 Jean-Paul Tremblay, P. G. Sorenson (1985). The Theory and Practice of Compiler Writing. McGraw–Hill.

Parsing algorithms